Hesperocharis costaricensis, the pallid tilewhite or Costa Rican white, is a butterfly in the family Pieridae. It is found from Mexico, through Central America to Venezuela.

Adults are on wing from February to March and again from June to July in Mexico.

Subspecies
The following subspecies are recognised:
Hesperocharis costaricensis costaricensis (Costa Rica)
Hesperocharis costaricensis pasion (Reakirt, [1867]) (Mexico, Guatemala) - Pasion tile-white

References

Anthocharini
Butterflies described in 1866
Taxa named by Henry Walter Bates
Butterflies of North America
Butterflies of Central America
Pieridae of South America